Michael Dominic DeShields (born April 23, 1998) is an American soccer player who plays as a defender who currently plays for USL Championship side Pittsburgh Riverhounds.

Career

Early life
DeShields was born in Baltimore, Maryland and attended the McDonogh School. In 2015 he led the school's varsity soccer team as it accomplished a 21-0-1 record and won the MIAA Class A State Championship. For his efforts, DeShields was honored as Maryland Boys' Soccer Gatorade Player of the Year in 2015. After graduating from McDonough, he went to college at Wake Forest University, joining their soccer team. DeShields was also part of the Baltimore Celtics academy.

In 2019, DeShields also appeared in the USL League Two for Treasure Coast Tritons.

Professional
On November 30, 2020, DeShields signed a contract with the New England Revolution II in USL League One while finishing his college career at Wake Forest. However, he did not appear on their roster, as the league's season was already over and DeShields entered the 2021 MLS SuperDraft from Wake Forest. He was selected in the first round with the fifth overall pick by D.C. United. Under MLS rules, D.C. United would either have to make him an offer, or his rights would default back to the Revolution II.

On February 5, 2021, DeShields officially signed with D.C. United.

On May 18, 2021, DeShields made his professional debut, appearing as a half-time substitute for D.C. United's USL Championship side Loudoun United during a 2–1 loss to New York Red Bulls II. DeShields made his first start for Loudoun on May 29, in a 1–0 win over New Mexico United.

Following the 2021 season, DeShields was released by D.C. United.

DeShields rejoined New England Revolution II on February 4, 2022, ahead of their inaugural MLS Next Pro season. Following the 2022 season, his option was declined by New England.

On February 28, 2023, DeShields joined USL Championship side Pittsburgh Riverhounds.

International
On January 27, 2021, DeShields was called up to the senior Trinidad and Tobago national football team camp to train for a friendly match against the United States men's national soccer team taking place on January 30. However, he did not appear on the gameday roster. DeShields is not yet cap-tied, so he is currently eligible to play for the senior team of either Trinidad & Tobago or the US.

Personal life
Michael Dominic DeShields is the son of Jeanette Gibbs and Michael DeShields, and is the oldest of their four children. He majored in Communications while at Wake Forest.

References

1998 births
Living people
American soccer players
American sportspeople of Trinidad and Tobago descent
Association football defenders
D.C. United players
D.C. United draft picks
Loudoun United FC players
MLS Next Pro players
New England Revolution II players
Pittsburgh Riverhounds SC players
Soccer players from Baltimore
Treasure Coast Tritons players
USL Championship players
USL League Two players
Wake Forest Demon Deacons men's soccer players